Fire Down Below is a 1957 British-American adventure drama film with a screenplay written by novelist Irwin Shaw, starring Rita Hayworth, Robert Mitchum and Jack Lemmon, and directed by Robert Parrish. Based on Max Catto's 1954 novel with the same title, the picture was made by Warwick Films on location in Trinidad and Tobago, in Technicolor and CinemaScope, and released by Columbia Pictures.

Plot
After the Korean War  Americans Tony (Lemmon) and Felix (Mitchum) own a tramp boat, the Ruby, which they use for small-scale smuggling around the Caribbean, along with a third crewman, Jimmy Jean (Edric Connor). One day their bartender contact, Miguel (Anthony Newley), introduces them to an American businessman who has been enjoying the company of beautiful but passport-less European goddess Irena (Hayworth). He has to return to Detroit, but wants to arrange for her to get to another island. They are reluctant, but $1,200 proves very tempting.

On the voyage Tony starts falling in love with her. Knowing the kind of woman she is, Felix does his best to protect his partner by warning Irena to stay away from Tony. However, Felix starts falling for her himself. When she disembarks, Tony goes with her, ending his partnership with Felix.

Tony and Jimmy Jean take on a shady job, but are intercepted by the authorities. They have to abandon ship and swim to a nearby island to avoid arrest. Tony takes a job on a cargo ship to get back to Irena. He also plans to kill Felix, correctly suspecting that his former partner tipped off the customs agents to get rid of the competition for Irena. However, while Tony is away, she goes to Felix and confesses she loves him.

After a collision, Tony is trapped below deck under a girder with time running out -  the ship is aflame and carrying a highly explosive cargo. Doctor Sam Blake (Bernard Lee) offers the only way out, by amputating Tony's trapped legs, but he would rather die. Felix goes aboard and stays with him. An explosion frees Tony from the wreckage, and Felix carries him to safety.

After Tony has recovered, he confronts Felix and Irena in a bar. It is there he realises that Irena loves Felix and not him, leaving him to walk away and cut his losses by saying, "some days you win, some days you lose".

Cast
 Rita Hayworth as Irena
 Robert Mitchum as Felix Bowers
 Jack Lemmon as Tony
 Herbert Lom as Harbour Master
 Bonar Colleano as Lt. Sellars
 Bernard Lee as Sam Blake
 Edric Connor as Jimmy Jean
 Peter Illing as Captain of Ulysses
 Joan Miller as Mrs. Canaday
 Anthony Newley as Miguel
 Eric Pohlmann as Hotel Owner
 Lionel Murton as The American
 Vivian Matalon as 1st U.S. Sailor 
 Gordon Tanner as 2nd U.S. Sailor
 Maurice Kaufmann as 3rd U.S. Sailor
 Murray Kash as Bartender
 Maya Koumani as Waitress
 Philip Baird as Young Man
 Keith Banks as Drunken Young Man
 'Stretch' Cox Troupe Limbo Dance by (as the 'Stretch' Cox Troupe) (as 'Stretch' Cox and His Troupe also)
 Shirley Rus as Other Dancer 
 Anatole Smirnoff as Other Dancer
 Sean Mostyn as Other Dancer
 Terence Skelton as Other Dancer (as Terry Skelton)
 Greta Remin as Other Dancer
 Robert Nelson as Other Dancer
 Lorna Wood as Other Dancer
 Brian Blades as Other Dancer
 Barbara Lane as Other Dancer
 Ken Tillson as Other Dancer
 Gina Chare as Other Dancer
 Roy Evans as Other Dancer

Production
The film was Rita Hayworth's return to motion pictures after a four-year absence. The producer and part-owner of the production company Warwick Films, Albert R. Broccoli, later to become famous as the producer of the first 16 Eon-made James Bond films, makes a cameo appearance in the film as a drug smuggler.

Release
The film had a gala premiere in the attendance of Princess Alexandra of Kent at the Odeon Marble Arch in London on 30 May 1957, and went on general release in Britain the next day. It premiered in the USA two months later, on 8 August 1957.

Reception

Box office
The film needed to make $5,500,000 to break even, and by October 1957 was going to come in $750,000 short. This financial failure caused Warwick Films to scale back its production.

Soundtrack
 The theme song, "Fire Down Below", was composed by Lester Lee with lyrics by Ned Washington, and sung by Jeri Southern.
 All harmonica themes in this film were composed and played by Jack Lemmon.
 The film's soundtrack score was conducted by Muir Mathieson with the Sinfonia of London.

See also
 List of American films of 1957

References

External links
 
 
 
 
 

1957 films
1950s adventure films
1950s adventure drama films
CinemaScope films
American buddy films
British buddy films
Films directed by Robert Parrish
Films scored by Douglas Gamley
Films with screenplays by Irwin Shaw
American adventure drama films
British adventure drama films
Seafaring films
Films set in the Caribbean
Films produced by Albert R. Broccoli
1950s dance films
1950s buddy films
1957 drama films
Films shot at MGM-British Studios
1950s English-language films
1950s American films
1950s British films